The Sind River or the Sindh River is a river in the Ganderbal district of the union territory of Jammu and Kashmir, India. It is a major tributary of the Jhelum River and is 108 kilometres long.

Geography

The Sind River forms the Sind Valley. It flows through Panjtarni (a camping site of Amarnath yatra) southwards up to Domail where it joins a tributary which doubles its flow from the Kolhoi Glacier. It then flows mostly westwards along the NH 1D and is fed by many glacial streams on its way to Ganderbal town. At Kichpora Preng it is fed by the Wangath river which flows down from the Gangabal Lake. The major tributaries of the river are: the Amarnath stream, Kolhoi Grar, Shitkadi Nallah, Gund Nallah, Surfraw Nallah and Wangath Nallah.

Surfraw Nallah is a big Nallah which joins the Sind river at Surfraw (Soraf raw). This Nallah is also known for its beauty and fish. The Sind river is navigable from Ganderbal town onwards as the waterflow slows down. It joins the Jhelum River at Shadipora, 17 kilometres northwest of Srinagar. The river also passes through the famous alpine hill station Sonamarg where river rafting tournaments are organised annually by the Tourism Department of Jammu and Kashmir. It is also the only river in Jammu and Kashmir on which three hydroelectric power plants are functional. The waters of the river are used for irrigation by way of different canals and for domestic use after going through water treatment plants.

Fish
The Sind River is the natural habitat of trout, and various other fish. The most famous among them are:
brown trout, (Salmo trutta) rainbow trout (Oncorynchus mykiss), snow trout (Schizothorax plagiostomus), Shuddgurn and Anyour.

Ecological issues 

Trout and hence trout fishing are at risk along the Sind river. This is for several reasons.

The extraction of sand/bajri by engagement of heavy machines is destroying the natural habitat of trout and other fish. Waste from the use of pesticides, DDT and insecticides by farmers kills many fish every day. The change in topography leads to the destruction of aquatic fauna of the river.
In various riverine villages people catch fish through the conventional way of angling and using nets. These methods are replaced today by resorting to unconventional and illegal methods. The most ecologically destructive method is using bleaching powder, procured from officials of the PHE department. Bleaching powder not only kills fish but other aquatic life as well. This process is very common during summers, especially in the Wayil catchment area.

The Fisheries Department and other government agencies have not been able to effectively intervene. Mismanagement of water diversion to power canals is another concern for the survival of fish.

Major projects on the Sind
 Upper Sind Hydroelectric Power project 1st Sumbal.
 Upper Sind Hydroelectric Power Project 2nd Kangan.
 Lower Sind Hydroelectric Power project Ganderbal.
 Rangil water treatment plant.

Major bridges
 Wayil Road Bridge of NH 1D. It is a steel structure bridge for one way vehicular traffic at a time.
Shithkadi Bridge of NH 1D. It is a steel structure bridge for two way vehicular traffic at a time.
Hariganiwan Link Road Bridge. It is one of the major steel bridge on River Sind for two way Vehicular traffic at time.
Ramwari Gund Link Road Bridge is another steel bridge on River Sind & The Construction work is in progress.
 Duderhama Road Bridge, connecting Ganderbal town.

See also
 Ganderbal
 Ganderbal District
 Manasbal Lake

References 

Indus basin
Rivers of Jammu and Kashmir
Geography of Ganderbal district
Rivers of India